Endodonta is a genus of small air-breathing land snails, terrestrial pulmonate gastropod mollusks in the family Endodontidae, an endemic family of land snails from the Hawaiian islands.

Species
Species within the genus Endodonta include:
 Endodonta apiculata (Ancey 1899)
 Endodonta binaria (L. Pfeiffer, 1856)
 Endodonta christenseni Slapcinsky, Yeung & Hayes, 1923
 Endodonta concentrata (Pilsbry & Vanatta, 1905)
 Endodonta ekahanuiensis (Solem, 1976)
 Endodonta fricki (L. Pfeiffer, 1858)
 Endodonta kalaeloana Christensen, 1982
 Endodonta kamehameha (Pilsbry & Vanatta, 1905)
 Endodonta lamellosa (Férussac, 1824)
 Endodonta laminata (Pease, 1866)
 Endodonta marsupialis Pilsbry & Vanatta, 1905
 Endodonta rugata (Pease, 1866)

References

 Ferussac (1825),  Voyage Uranie et Physicienne Freycinet Zool. 2ème partie
 Ferussac & Deshayes (1832), Histoire naturelle générale et particulière des mollusques terrestres et fluviatiles, Atlas , Pls 8E, 9B, 24A, 27A, 28B, 46A, 50, 51A, 54A, 56, 56A, 56B, 64-69, 69A, 71, 74, 79, 80, 82, 109, 117, 124A, 126, 131B, 133, 140, 141, 141A, 142B, 147, 148, 153, 155, 163 Chez Baillière, J.-B. Paris
 Bank, R. A. (2017). Classification of the Recent terrestrial Gastropoda of the World. Last update: July 16th, 2017

External links
 Taxonomy and authority
 Albers, J. C. (1850). Die Heliceen nach natürlicher Verwandtschaft systematisch geordnet. Berlin: Enslin. 262 pp

Endodontidae
Taxonomy articles created by Polbot
Gastropod genera